Borja Sánchez Gil (born 14 February 1987) is a Spanish footballer who plays for UD San Sebastián de los Reyes as a midfielder.

He spent most of his career in the Segunda División B, playing 348 games across 14 seasons for 13 clubs. He also had brief professional spells at Girona and Greek team Kerkyra.

Club career
Born in Talavera de la Reina, Province of Toledo, Sánchez began his career at RSD Alcalá, making his senior debut on 20 February 2005 as a late substitute in a 3–0 away loss against UD Lanzarote in the Segunda División B. The following campaign, he played more regularly as the team from the Community of Madrid were relegated.

Sánchez remained in the third division with Atlético Madrid B, playing just twice in 2006–07. In his first start, a 0–1 home defeat to Racing de Santander B on 17 September 2006, he received a straight red card before half-time in what would be his last appearance; after returning to Alcalá in Tercera División, he had one-season spells back in the third level with Real Balompédica Linense and CD Dénia, suffering relegation with the former.

On 28 June 2010, Sánchez signed a one-year deal at Girona FC with the option for a second. He made his debut for his new club on 1 September in a Copa del Rey second leg at the Estadi Montilivi, playing the entirety of a 1–1 draw against SD Huesca (5–3 penalty shootout loss); he was scoreless across the campaign in Segunda División, in which he started just twice.

Subsequently, Sánchez returned to division three, joining SD Ponferradina on 14 June 2011. He totalled 33 official games and two goals during his only season, helping to a return to the second tier after one year.

Sánchez remained in Castile and León and the third tier, signing for UD Salamanca on 7 August 2012. In a campaign which ended with administrative relegation, he scored a career-best 13 goals, including three braces in two victories over Sporting de Gijón B and another against CD Guijuelo.

Sánchez spent the next year at Huesca, who terminated his contract for financial reasons in June 2014. The following month, he moved abroad for the first time, signing at PAE Kerkyra.

On 6 July 2015, after only two starts and two substitute appearances as well as relegation from the Super League Greece, Sánchez returned to his homeland and its third division, joining CD Alcoyano.

References

External links
 

1987 births
Living people
People from Talavera de la Reina
Sportspeople from the Province of Toledo
Spanish footballers
Footballers from Castilla–La Mancha
Association football midfielders
Segunda División players
Segunda División B players
Tercera División players
Primera Federación players
RSD Alcalá players
Atlético Madrid B players
Real Balompédica Linense footballers
CD Dénia footballers
Girona FC players
SD Ponferradina players
UD Salamanca players
SD Huesca footballers
CD Alcoyano footballers
CF Fuenlabrada footballers
CD Mirandés footballers
UD Logroñés players
Burgos CF footballers
UD San Sebastián de los Reyes players
Super League Greece players
PAE Kerkyra players
Spanish expatriate footballers
Expatriate footballers in Greece
Spanish expatriate sportspeople in Greece